"See Me, Feel Me" (aka Listening To You/See Me, Feel Me and See Me, Feel Me/Listening To You) is a song from the Who's 1969 album Tommy. It consists of two overture parts from Tommy, the second and third parts of the album's final song "We're Not Gonna Take It": "See Me, Feel Me" and "Listening To You". It was released as a single in September 1970. The song is not identified as a separate track on the 1969 studio version of the album.

The Who performed "See Me, Feel Me", followed by the refrain of "Listening To You", at the 1969 Woodstock Festival. This was captured on film in  Woodstock (1970) and The Kids Are Alright (1979). "See Me, Feel Me" was also released as a single in the United States to capitalise on its appearance in the Woodstock film. Entering the charts on 23 September 1970, it reached number 12 on the Pop Singles Chart. It was also released in the United Kingdom but did not chart there.

The band performed this song at the Closing Ceremony of the 2012 Olympic Games in London on Sunday 12 August 2012, along with "Baba O'Riley" and "My Generation".

References

The Who songs
1970 singles
Songs written by Pete Townshend
Decca Records singles
Polydor Records singles
Track Records singles
Song recordings produced by Kit Lambert